José Francisco Lavat Pacheco (September 23, 1948 – May 15, 2018), better known as José Lavat, was a Mexican voice actor.

Filmography

Animated films

Animated TV shows
La Guerra de las Galaxias: Guerra Clónicas - El Conde Dooku/Darth Tyrannus
Star Wars: The Clone Wars - El Conde Dooku/Darth Tyrannus

Anime
Death Note -  Soichiro Yagami
Dragon Ball Z - Narrator
Dragon Ball GT - Narrator (episodes 1-9)
Dragon Ball Super - Narrator (2015–18)
Slam Dunk - Narrator

Live action
Sol Bianca - Rammy
Hook - Peter Banning/Peter Pan
Indiana Jones - Indiana Jones
Jumanji - Alan Parrish
 X-Men (film franchise) - Erik Lehnsherr/Magneto (Ian McKellen) 
Lord of the Rings trilogy - Gandalf
Silverado - Jake
 Night at the Museum - Cecil Fredericks (Dick Van Dyke)
Star Wars prequels (Episodes II and III) - Count Dooku/Darth Tyrannus
Street Fighter - William F. Guile
Saw IV, Saw V, Saw VI, Jigsaw - John Kramer / Jigsaw

Honours and awards
Lavat was also the founder of the Lavat Awards which debuted in 2019, created in recognition to the work and contributions made by numerous voice artists and announcers in Latin America.

References

External links
 
 
 

1948 births
2018 deaths
20th-century Mexican male actors
21st-century Mexican male actors
Deaths from kidney failure
Male actors from Mexico City
Mexican male stage actors
Mexican male television actors
Mexican male voice actors
Mexican radio personalities
Mexican male video game actors